The 1993–94 Football League season was Birmingham City Football Club's 91st in the Football League. They finished in 22nd position in the 24-team Division One, so were relegated to the third tier for 1994–95. They entered the 1993–94 FA Cup at the third-round stage, and lost their opening match to non-League club Kidderminster Harriers, and entered the League Cup in the first round, losing in the second to fellow Birmingham-based club Aston Villa. They were eliminated in the preliminary group of the Anglo-Italian Cup.

After a poor start to the season, manager Terry Cooper resigned, believing that new owner David Sullivan wanted to bring in his own man. He was replaced by Southend United manager Barry Fry, at the cost of a record Football League fine of £130,000 after being found guilty of poaching Fry and his staff. At the end of the season, the Kop and Tilton Road terraces of the St Andrew's ground were demolished, to be re-opened the following season as all-seater stands.

The club's top scorer in league matches was Andy Saville with ten goals; Saville and Paul Peschisolido scored ten in all competitions.

Football League Division One

Match details

League table (part)

Note that goals scored took precedence over goal difference as a tiebreaker in the Football League.

Results summary

FA Cup

League Cup

Anglo-Italian Cup

Appearances and goals

Numbers in parentheses denote appearances as substitute.
Players with name struck through and marked  left the club during the playing season.
Players with names in italics and marked * were on loan from another club for the whole of their season with Birmingham.

See also
Birmingham City F.C. seasons

Sources
 
 
 For match dates, league positions and results: 
 For lineups, appearances, goalscorers and attendances: Matthews (2010), Complete Record, pp. 422–23, 477.

References

Birmingham City F.C. seasons
Birmingham City